Philip Albert Inman, 1st Baron Inman, PC (12 June 1892 – 26 August 1979) was a British Labour politician.

Background and education
Inman was the son of Philip Inman (d. 1894), of Knaresborough, Yorkshire, by his wife Hannah Bickerdyke, of Great Ouseburn, Yorkshire. He was educated at Headingley College, Leeds, and Leeds University. He fought in the First World War, where he was invalided out. He married May Dew on 27 August 1919; they had a son, Philip John Cope Inman, on 15 March 1929.

Career
In 1946 he was raised to the peerage as Baron Inman, of Knaresborough in the West Riding of the County of York. He served under Clement Attlee as Lord Privy Seal, with a seat in the cabinet, from April to October 1947, when he resigned. The same year he was Chairman of the Board of Governors of the BBC.

Personal life and death
Lord Inman died in August 1979, aged 87. His son had predeceased him in 1968 and so the barony became extinct.

Legacy 
A plaque in Knaresborough commemorates the house in which Inman was born.

References

External links

1892 births
1979 deaths
Chairmen of the BBC
People from Knaresborough
BBC Governors
Members of the Privy Council of the United Kingdom
Labour Party (UK) hereditary peers
Ministers in the Attlee governments, 1945–1951
Barons created by George VI